Tournachon Peak is a peak, 860 m, rising south of Spring Point on the west coast of Graham Land. Photographed by the Falkland Islands and Dependencies Aerial Survey Expedition (FIDASE) in 1956–57, and mapped from these photos by the Falkland Islands Dependencies Survey (FIDS). Named by the United Kingdom Antarctic Place-Names Committee (UK-APC) in 1960 for Gaspard F. Tournachon (1820–1910), known professionally as Nadar, French portrait photographer and aeronaut who took the first air photos from a captive balloon in 1858 and suggested their use for mapmaking.

Mountains of Graham Land
Danco Coast